The National Teacher of the Year is a professional award in the United States. The program began in 1952, as a project by the Council of Chief State School Officers (CCSSO), and aims to reward excellence in teaching. It is sponsored by ING.

Selection process

Every year, nominations are made by students, principals, teachers and administrators for the State Teacher of the Year awards. The profiles of the winners from all 50 states, the District of Columbia, American Samoa, Guam, Northern Mariana Islands, and U.S. Virgin Islands and the Department of Defense Education Activity are submitted to a selection committee made up of representatives from each of the major education organizations. The committee then reviews the data for each candidate and selects four finalists. The winner is chosen from these finalists based on their biography, interview and eight essays they must submit. The award is traditionally presented by the President of the United States in the White House Rose Garden.

Although there are no clearly defined requirements the committee looks for:
 The ability to inspire children from all backgrounds and abilities
 The respect of colleagues, students, and parents
 Activity in the community
 The ability to fulfill the duties of the award

Duties

The National Teacher of The Year spends a year away from his or her teaching duties to serve as a spokesman and advocate for the teaching profession. The teacher's state and district continue to pay his/her salary in this year. The arrangements for travel and speaking engagements during the recognition year are taken care of by the CCSSO.

Winners

References

External links
National Teacher of the Year at CCSSO
National State Teachers of the Year

Teacher awards
American education awards